Design42Day is a company based in Milan, Italy, specialized in the research, selection and promotion of design on an international scale.

History and personnel
Design42Day began as a recreational blog in 2007 by Riccardo Capuzzo, the Art Director and Editor-in-Chief. Patrick Abbattista, who joined the project in 2009 as Co-Founder and Head of Sales and Marketing, left the company in 2015 to launch DesignWanted , currently one of the most influential voices on Instagram about Architecture & Design. While Camilla Rettura hold the position of Executive Editor from 2012 till 2014. In 2012, Design42Day contributed to the foundation of the “Bocconi Students 4 Design” association in Bocconi University and participated in the launching of their first event with Italian designer Fabio Novembre.

Design42Day’s online magazine focuses on five different areas of design, including fashion, industrial design, visual design, transportation design and architecture.

Special projects
Design42Day is involved in several special projects. Since 2011, they have a dedicated section on the online magazine reserved for the Istituto Europeo di Design where they showcase interviews and news about talented students. Furthermore, they have played an active role in bringing both the Istituto Europeo di Design and the Adobe Design Achievement Awards to the Moscow Design Week in 2012. The same year, Design42Day has collaborated closely with the Electrolux Design Lab for the search of a Social Media Correspondent to cover Electrolux’s event in the fall. Design42Day has launched a project dedicated to the presentation of international talents to sell in their personal corner within the White Gallery lifestyle store in Rome, Italy.

International events
In 2011, Design42Day closed ten media partnerships with various design and fashion weeks around the world. In 2012, the number of media partnerships grew to thirteen, including the Red Dot Design Award.

Partners
 Zooppa
 PCHouse.com.cn
 Istituto Europeo di Design

2011
 Riga Fashion Week 
 Modalisboa 
 Moscow Design Week 
 Belgrade Fashion Week 
 BCN Design Week 
 Beijing Design Week 
 Adobe Design Achievement Awards 
 Colombiamoda 
 Sofia Design Week 
 New Designers 
 Electrolux Design Lab 

2012
 Riga Fashion Week 
 Modalisboa 
 AGideas 
 International Talent Support 
 Mercedes-Benz Kiev Fashion Days 
 Red Dot 
 Adobe Design Achievement Awards 
 Sofia Design Week 
 New Designers 
 Electrolux Design Lab 
 World Brand Congress 
 Belarus Fashion Week  

2013
 IDE Design Mission Middle East 2013

See also
 List of companies of Italy

References

Further reading
 
 
 
 
 
"Intervista a Patrick Abbattista, il fondatore di DesignWanted". VILLEGIARDINI, 17 January 2018
"Intervista a Patrick Abbattista, di DesignWanted". Mashable Social Media Day, September 2018

External links

2007 establishments in Italy
Design companies established in 2007
Design companies of Italy
Design magazines
Italian companies established in 2007
Italian-language magazines
Italian websites
Magazines established in 2007
Magazines published in Milan